Sport Vereniging Arsenal commonly abbreviated as SV Arsenal, is a Surinamese football club based in Nieuw Amsterdam that played in the Surinamese Hoofdklasse, the highest level of football in Suriname. They play their home games on the Mr. Bronsplein in Paramaribo. Named after the English football club Arsenal, the club was founded on  6 February 1921, and won the National championship twice, in the 1938–39 and the 1939–40 season.

The club currently compete in the Domburg Sportbond (DSB) league, one of the amateur district leagues in Suriname.

Honours
Hoofdklasse
Champions (2):1938–39, 1939–40

References

External links
 De eerste Surinaamse sportencyclopedie (1893–1988) by Ricky W. Stutgard

Arsenal
1921 establishments in Suriname